The Horus on the Crocodiles or Horus cippus or Horus stele is a group of  ancient Egyptian amulets, or healing statues, from the Third Intermediate Period until the end of the Ptolemaic dynasty. Well known specimens include the so-called Metternich stela (MET Museum), the Banobal stele and Djedhor healing statue (Egyptian Museum in Cairo) and the Priest of Bastet status (Louvre).

The Horus cippus usually takes the form of a stone slab depicting  god Horus in the form of a child (Harpocrates) standing on two crocodiles and holding other dangerous animals such as snakes and scorpions. In older specimens, the head of the protective god Bes is depicted above the child's figure, protruding from the body of the cippa, which later became part of the frame. The stelae contain Egyptian hieroglyphs with mythological and magical texts recited in the treatment of diseases and for protection against bites, stings or bites. This portrayal is thought to follow the myth of Horus triumphing over dangerous animals in the marshes of Khemmis (Akhmim).

Gallery of notable depictions

Bibliography

Broad
 Sternberg-el-Hotabi 1994. C. Sternberg-el-Hotabi. Der Untergang der Hieroglyphenschrift, Chronique d'Egypte 69 (1994). 218-248
 Andrews, Carol, 1994. Amulets of Ancient Egypt. London: British Museum Press.
 Gasse, Annie, 2004. Les stèles d’Horus sur les crocodiles. Paris: Éditions de la Réunion des musées nationaux.
 Quack, Joachim, 2002. “Review of Sternberg-el Hotabi 1999,” Orientalische Literaturzeiting 97:6, 713-39.
 Ritner, Robert K., 1989. “Horus on the Crocodiles: a Juncture of Religion and Magic in Late Dynastic Egypt.” In Religion and Philosophy in Ancient Egypt, ed. William Kelly Simpson. New Haven: Yale University Press. 103-16.

Individual steles
 
 Berlev/Hodjash 1982. O. Berlev/S Hodjash. Egyptian Stelae in the Pushkin Museum of Fine Arts. Moscow
 Berlandini 2002. J. Berlandini. Un monument magique du "Quatrieme prophete d'Amon" Nakhtefmout. in Y. Koenig. La Magie en Egypte: a la recherche d'une definition. Paris. 83-148

References

Horus
Ancient Egyptian culture
Ancient Egyptian society
Ancient Egyptian symbols
Egyptian amulets
Magic symbols